Bernhardt Martin Esau, also Bernhard or Bernard (born 9 December 1957), is a Namibian politician.  A member of the South West Africa People's Organization (SWAPO), Esau has been a member of the National Assembly since being nominated by President Sam Nujoma and subsequently elected in the 1994 Namibian general election. 

Esau became a member of parliament in 1995 and joined cabinet in 1999 as deputy minister of Trade and Industry. In 2010 he was promoted to Minister of Fisheries and Marine Resources, a portfolio he held until November 2019 when he was forced to resign in the wake of the Fishrot scandal.

Career
Esau was born in Swakopmund, Erongo Region on 9 December 1957. He earned his matric at St. Josephs Training College in Döbra in 1977 and graduated from the University of Fort Hare in 1984 with a degree in Commerce. Esau rose through the Mineworkers Union of Namibia to become secretary general of the umbrella National Union of Namibian Workers (NUNW) in 1991. In 1992, during a time of debate concerning the role of Namibia's trade unions, Esau favored maintaining an alliance with SWAPO. However, Esau later in 1994 suggested that the trade unions could form their own political party if workers' rights continued to be ignored by the SWAPO government.

In the same year he was placed on the National Assembly list for SWAPO and was voted into the National Assembly in the parliamentary election. Esau was a member of the politburo of SWAPO from 1991 to 1997, and of the central committee of the party since 1991. As deputy minister of Trade and Industry, Esau supported liberal economic policies, including the setting up of export processing zones in Namibia where labour laws do not apply. From March 2010 Esau served as Minister of Fisheries and Marine Resources. In president Hage Geingob's cabinet, appointed in March 2015, Esau was retained in his post.

Bribery scandal
In November 2019 he was forced to resign over allegations that he took bribes in exchange for providing fishing quotas to the Icelandic fishing company Samherji. He was subsequently arrested on these charges, along with the former justice minister Sacky Shanghala.

Private life
Esau is married to Swamma Mbulu since the 1980s. The couple has four children. They own a house in Windhoek's Hochland Park suburb, a plot in Otjiwarongo, and the  farm Dakota in Omaheke Region.

References

1957 births
Living people
Members of the National Assembly (Namibia)
Namibian trade unionists
People from Swakopmund
University of Fort Hare alumni
SWAPO politicians
Fisheries ministers of Namibia